Presentation College (PC) is a private Roman Catholic college with its main campus in Aberdeen, South Dakota, and a branch campus in Fairmont, Minnesota. The college, founded in 1951 and co-educational since 1968, enrolls nearly 800 students. It takes its name from the Sisters of the Presentation of the Blessed Virgin Mary (PBVM), the original sponsors. It grew out of their Notre Dame Junior College, founded in 1922 in Mitchell, South Dakota. The college plans to close at the end of summer 2023 due to financial and enrollment challenges.

Campus 
PC is located on a  campus at 1500 N. Main Street in Aberdeen, South Dakota. A branch campus exists in Fairmont, Minnesota. The college also offers instruction online through PC Virtual.

Academics 
PC offers Bachelor of Science, Associate of Science, Associate of Arts, and certificate programs with a focus on health and medical-related programs.

Athletics 
The Presentation athletic teams are called the Saints. The college is a member of the National Association of Intercollegiate Athletics (NAIA), primarily competing in the North Star Athletic Association (NSAA) as a founding member since the 2013–14 academic year. The Saints previously competed as an NCAA D-III Independent during the 2012–13 school year; as well as a member in the Upper Midwest Athletic Conference (UMAC) of the NCAA Division III ranks from 2002–03 to 2011–12.

Presentation competes in ten intercollegiate varsity sports: Men's sports include baseball, basketball, cross country, football and soccer; while women's sports include basketball, cross country, soccer, softball (fast-pitch) and volleyball. Athletic scholarships are available.

References

External links 
 
 Official athletics website
 

Presentation Sisters schools
Educational institutions established in 1951
Buildings and structures in Aberdeen, South Dakota
Education in Brown County, South Dakota
USCAA member institutions
Association of Catholic Colleges and Universities
Catholic universities and colleges in South Dakota
Sports teams in Aberdeen, South Dakota
1951 establishments in South Dakota